XO-3 is a star in the constellation Camelopardalis. The star has a magnitude of 10 and is not visible to the naked eye but is visible through a small telescope. A search for a binary companion star using adaptive optics at the MMT Observatory was negative.

Planetary system
In 2007 the gas giant exoplanet XO-3b was discovered by the XO Telescope using the transit method. This object may be classed as brown dwarf because of its high mass.

See also
 XO Telescope

References

External links
 

F-type main-sequence stars
Camelopardalis (constellation)
Planetary transit variables
Planetary systems with one confirmed planet